Bešište is a village in Municipality of Prilep, North Macedonia. It used to be part of the former municipality of Vitolište.

Demographics
According to the 2002 census, the village had a total of 22 inhabitants. Ethnic groups in the village include:

Macedonians 22

References

Villages in Prilep Municipality